The Super Friendz are a Canadian indie rock band from Halifax, Nova Scotia. They were initially active between 1994 and 1997, before reforming in 2003.

Contemporaries of Sloan, their early work was on Sloan's Murderecords label.

Career
The Super Friendz were formed in 1994 by three King's College students Charles Austin (vocals and bass), Matt Murphy (vocals and guitar), Drew Yamada (vocals and guitar). Until 1996 the band had no permanent drummer, at various times  Chris Murphy (no relation to Matt) of Sloan, Cliff Gibb of Thrush Hermit, and Dave Marsh filled the role until Lonnie James was chosen as a permanent member.

In 1994, The Super Friendz released the cassette Sticktoitiveness independently, and the single "By Request" on Murderecords, and later toured Canada with Sloan.

The band's first album, Mock Up, Scale Down was released on Murderecords. The singles "10 lbs.", "Karate Man" and "Rescue Us from Boredom" were released from the album, which was a Juno Award nominee for Alternative Album of the Year at the Juno Awards of 1996. Mock Up, Scale Down was reissued in the United States in 1997 on March Records under the title Sticktoitiveness. Mock Up, Scale Down was again reissued on Murderecords on vinyl as a 2xLP in 2013.

In 1996 the band contributed the song "Blue Tattoo" to the compilation album A Tribute to Hard Core Logo, and released the EP Play the Game, Not Games on Murderecords. The songs on Play the Game—especially the contributions of Austin and Yamada—were significantly more experimental than on the album.

The band's second album, Slide Show, was released in early 1997. Critical response to the album was highly favourable, although some identified signs of creative tension in the album's diverse array of styles. By August, the band had broken up.

Post-breakup

Matt Murphy later re-emerged with a new band called The Flashing Lights. He has also played with the bands City Field and Cookie Duster, and starred in the film The Life and Hard Times of Guy Terrifico. In 2015, he formed a new band, TUNS, with Chris Murphy and Mike O'Neill.

Austin and Yamada launched the project Neuseiland with Joel Plaskett, then of Thrush Hermit. Austin is now a recording engineer and producer in Halifax, and has contributed to albums by Buck 65, Matt Mays, Joel Plaskett, Garrett Mason and many others.
Yamada later toured with O'Neill and others, before leaving the music industry full-time to pursue post-secondary education. James went on to release two critically acclaimed solo records on Teenage USA, as well as recording and touring as a drummer in Royal City.

In late December 2002, the Super Friendz came back together for a special holiday reunion. The band recorded a reunion album, Love Energy, which was released in 2003. A small tour followed in September.

Discography
Sticktoitiveness (1994)
Mock Up, Scale Down (1995)                                                                                                                                                                                                            
Play the Game not Games E.P. (1996)                                                                                                                                                                                                    
Slide Show (1997)
LoveEnergy (2003)

References

External links
The Super Friendz

Canadian indie rock groups
Murderecords artists
Musical groups established in 1994
Musical groups disestablished in 1997
Musical groups from Halifax, Nova Scotia
Canadian power pop groups
Musical groups reestablished in 2003